DSO Cerveno Zname Sofia was an ice hockey team in Sofia, Bulgaria.

History
The club was founded in 1949 as a merger between Sredets Sofia (founded in 1942) and Sportist Sofia (founded in 1939). They won nine Bulgarian Hockey League titles between 1949 and 1963.

In 1963, Cerveno Zname Sofia merged with CSKA Sofia. The merged club was known as CSKA Cerveno Zname Sofia for a few years afterwards.

Achievements
Bulgarian Hockey League champion (9): 1951, 1952, 1956, 1958, 1959, 1960, 1961, 1962, 1963.
Bulgarian Hockey League runner-up (2): 1953, 1954.

External links
Team profile on hockeyarenas.net
Teams chart on hockeyarenas.net

Bulgarian Hockey League teams
Ice hockey teams in Bulgaria